Fritz Schmidt (19 November 1903 in Eisbergen, nowadays part of Porta Westfalica, Westphalia – 26 June 1943 in Chartres) was the German Commissioner-General for Political Affairs and Propaganda in the occupied Netherlands between 1940 and 1943, one of four assistants to the Governor-General, Arthur Seyss-Inquart. 

He is regarded as a compromiser and promoted the interests of Anton Mussert and the Nationaal-Socialistische Beweging (NSB).

Schmidt died at the age of 39 on 26 June 1943, after he "fell, jumped, or was pushed out of a train"  and was succeeded by Wilhelm Ritterbusch.

References

1903 births
1943 deaths
Netherlands in World War II
Nazi Party officials
Members of the Reichstag of Nazi Germany
Railway accident deaths in France